Amadou Damaro Camara (born 1952) is a politician from Guinea who served as President of the National Assembly of Guinea from 2020 to September 2021. In April 2022, he was jailed.

References 

Guinean politicians
1952 births
Living people
Presidents of the National Assembly (Guinea)